Aberdeen University Boat Club is a rowing club on the River Dee, based at S Esplanade W, Aberdeen. The club is affiliated to Scottish Rowing.

History
The club belongs to the University of Aberdeen and was founded in 1865. In 2012 the club formed University Rowing Aberdeen (URA) in partnership with the Robert Gordon University Boat Club so that both clubs could share resources, funding and coaching.

The club has produced several national champions.

Honours

National champions

References

Sports teams in Aberdeen
Rowing clubs in Scotland
1865 establishments in Scotland
University of Aberdeen
University and college sports clubs in Scotland